Tai Tham script (Tham meaning "scripture") is an abugida writing system used mainly for a group of Southwestern Tai languages i.e., Northern Thai, Tai Lü, Khün and Lao; as well as the liturgical languages of Buddhism i.e., Pali and Sanskrit. It is historically known as Tua Tham (​ᨲ᩠ᩅᩫᨵᨾ᩠ᨾ᩼​ or ᨲ᩠ᩅᩫᨵᩢᨾ᩠ᨾ᩼). In Thailand and Myanmar, the script is often referred to as Lanna script (RTGS: Lanna Akara) in relation to the historical kingdom of Lan Na situating in the Northern region of modern day Thailand and a part of Shan state in Myanmar. Local people in Northern Thailand also call the script as Tua Mueang in parallel to Kam Mueang, a local name for Northern Thai language. In Laos and Isan region of Thailand, a variation of Tai Tham script, often dubbed Lao Tham, is also known by the locals as To Tham Lao (cf.  BGN/PCGN to tham) or Yuan script. Tai Tham script is traditionally written on a dried palm leaf as a palm-leaf manuscript.

The Northern Thai language is a close relative of (standard) Thai. It is spoken by nearly 6 million people in Northern Thailand and several thousand in Laos of whom few are literate in Lanna script. The script is still read by older monks. Northern Thai has six linguistic tones and Thai only five, making transcription into the Thai alphabet problematic. There is some resurgent interest in the script among younger people, but an added complication is that the modern spoken form, called Kam Muang, differs in pronunciation from the older form.

There are 670,000 speakers of Tai Lü, some of those born before 1950 are literate in Tham, also known as Old Tai Lue. The script has also continued to be taught in the monasteries. The New Tai Lue script is derived from Tham. There are 120,000 speakers of Khün for which Lanna is the only script.

History

The Tai Tham script shows a strong similarity to the Mon script used by the Mon kingdom of Haripunjaya around the 13th century CE, in the present-day Lamphun Province of Northern Thailand. The oldest known document containing the Tai Tham script is dated to 1376 CE and was found in Sukhothai. The document is a bilingual inscription on a gold folio, containing one line of Pali written in the Tai Tham script, while the vernacular is written in the Siamese language, using the Sukhothai script. The Tai Tham script was adapted to write vernacular languages not later than the 15th century CE, most probably in Chiang Mai, in the Lan Na Kingdom. The script spread from Lan Na to surrounding areas such as modern day Laos, Isan, Shan State and Sipsong Panna. Numerous local variants developed, such as the Lue variant (Sipsong Panna), the Khuen variant (Shan State) and the Tham Lao variant (Laos and Isan). The variants differ only slightly in appearance, and the system of writing has remained the same. As the name suggests, the use of the Tham (Dharma) script in Lao was restricted to religious literature, either used to transcribe Pali, or religious treatises written in Lao intended solely for the clergy. Religious instructional materials and prayer books dedicated to the laity were written in Tai Noi instead. As a result, only a few people outside the temples were literate in the script. In Isan, evidence of the script includes two stone inscriptions, such as the one housed at Wat Tham Suwannakhuha in Nong Bua Lamphu, dated to 1564, and another from Wat Mahaphon in Maha Sarakham from the same period.

Most of the script is recorded on palm-leaf manuscripts, many of which were destroyed during the 'Thaification' purges of the 1930s; contemporaneously this period of Thai nationalisation also ended its use as the primary written language in Northern Thailand. Although no longer in use in Isan, the alphabet is enjoying a resurgence in Northern Thailand, and is still used as the primary written script for the Tai Lü and Tai Khün languages spoken in the 'Golden Triangle' where Thailand, Laos, Burma and southern China meet. Its use is rather limited to the long-term monks in Laos and most materials published today are in the modern Lao script.

Characteristics
Although both the ancient forms of the Mon and Khmer script are different, they are both abugidas that descend from the Brahmic scripts introduced via contacts with South Indian traders, soldiers, merchants and Brahmans. As a Mon-derived script, Tai Tham has many similarities with the writing systems for Burmese, Shan, Rakhine and modern Mon and rounder letter forms compared to the angled letters of Khmer. Letters also are more circular or rounded than the typically angled style of Khmer.

Consonants 
There are 43 Tai Tham consonants. They are divided into three groups: categorized consonants (ᨻ᩠ᨿᩢᨬ᩠ᨩᨶᨶᩲᩅᩢᨣ᩠ᨣ᩼, payanjana​ nai wak), non-categorized consonants (ᨻ᩠ᨿᩢᨬ᩠ᨩᨶᩋᩅᩢᨣ᩠ᨣ᩼), and additional consonants (ᨻ᩠ᨿᩢᨬ᩠ᨩᨶᨲᩮᩬᩥ᩵ᨾ, payanjana tueam). Categorized consonants and non-categorized consonants are those derived from Old Mon script used for Pali and Sanskrit languages. Similar to Devanagari, Pallava script, and Burmese script, categorized consonants are divided into 5 subgroups called wak (ᩅᩢᨣ᩠ᨣ᩼) i.e., wak ka (ᨠ), wak ja​ (ᨧ), wak rata (ᨭ), wak ta (ᨲ), and wak pa (ᨷ). The additional consonants are the consonants invented to write Tai sounds that are originally not found in Pali. In a dictionary, letter ᩂ​ and ᩄ are often put in the consonant list following the letter ᩁ and ᩃ respectively. However, they are a syllabary (also a vowel) and not a consonant letter.

Consonant chart 

There are 25 categorized consonants, 10 non-categorized consonants, and 8 additional consonants. Similar to Khmer, Tai Tham also has a subjoined form called haang (ᩉᩣ᩠ᨦ), tua joeng (ᨲ᩠ᩅᩫᨩᩮᩥ᩠ᨦ), or tua hoy (ᨲ᩠ᩅᩫᩉᩬ᩠ᨿ᩶). In the Unicode input method, sakot sign (U1A60) (◌᩠) is used to trigger the subjoined forms. The additional consonants are shown in yellow. These consonants have the characteristics of lacking the subjoined form. Similar to Thai script and Lao script, consonants in Tai Tham can be classified into high, mid, and low classes regarding to the tone rules. 

 Notes

Consonant combinations and ligatures

Consonant digraph with Ha 
Certain consonants in the low-class group lack their high-class counterpart. These consonants are sometimes called the single low-class consonants. Their high-class counterparts are created by the combination with letter high Ha (ᩉ) as a digraph, called Ha Nam (ᩉ​ ᨶᩣᩴ).

 Notes

Special letters 

Notes

Vowels 
Vowel characters come in two forms: as stand-alone letters for writing initial vowels or as diacritics that can be attached to all sides of the consonant letters. However, Lanna excels in terms of the number of diacritics used. Some vowel sounds can be written with a combination of as many as four diacritics: one on each side of the consonant.

Dependent vowels

Independent vowels 
Independent vowels are mainly reserved for writing Pali words, except for  /ʔau/ which is used as a special vowel sign and not for Pali words.

Tone marks

Tone mark conjugation 
There are six phonemic tones in the Chiang Mai dialect of Northern Thai: low-rising, low-falling, high-level with glottal stop, mid-level, high-falling, and high-rising. Tones in Chiang Mai dialect are very close to the standard Thai five tones systems and the equivalence can be drawn between the two. Lanna–Thai dictionaries often equate Chiang Mai tones with standard Thai tones, shown in a table below.

  
Tone mark conjugation system of Tai Tham highly correlates with the system used by Thai script. Despite the difference in tone quality between Northern Thai, Tai Khuen, Thai, and Lao; equivalent words in each language are, in large part, marked with the same (or equivalent) tone mark. For example, the word ᨣ᩶ᩤ​ which is equivalent to Thai ค้า, and Lao ຄ້າ all has the same meaning "to trade" and is expressed with the same or equivalent tone mark mai tho/mai kho jang  but is pronounced with different tones differed by the languages.   

Tone mark conjugation in Tai Tham follows the same model used for Thai script. Consonants are divided into 3 classes: high, mid, low; with some degree of variation form Thai script due to the phonological differences between Northern Thai and standard Thai. Consonants in each class are combined with these tone marks to give a different tonal pattern.       

Only two tone marks mai yo (᩵)​ and mai kho jang (᩶)​ are mainly used. Low class and High class consonants only have one tone per one tone mark. Hence, to achieve the 6 tones while using only 2 tone marks (and one case of no tone mark), they are conjugated as a couple of the same sound. 

Notes

   
Mid class consonants ([ʔ], [b], [d], and [j]) do not have a couple for tone conjugation. Hence, different tones can be expressed with the same tone mark. Readers have to rely on the context in order to know the correct tone pronunciation. Therefore, to solve this ambiguity, three new tone marks: mai ko nuea​ (᩷),​ mai song nuea​ (᩸), and mai sam nuea​ (᩹) were invented for the mid class consonants in Khuen language. However, these three new tone marks aren't used in Lanna spelling convention and even in Khuen, they are rarely used. The use of these new three tone marks is also not standardized and may also differ between the dialects of Khuen language.

Moreover, similar to standard Thai, the tonal pattern for each consonant class also differs by vowel length and final consonant sounds, which can be divided into the "checked" and "unchecked" syllables. Checked syllables are a group of syllables with the obstruent coda sounds [p̚], [t̚], [k̚], and [ʔ] (short vowel with no final consonant actually ends with the glottal stop, but often omitted). The unchecked syllables are a group of syllables with the sonorant coda sound [m], [n], [ŋ], [j], and [w].  

Hence, by combining the consonant classes and the system of checked–unchecked syllables, the full tone conjugation table can be constructed as shown below. Color codes are assigned in the table to each tone mark: cyan - no tone mark; yellow - mai yo (equi. Thai mai ek); pink - mai kho jang (equi. Thai mai tho). Low class and high class rows are paired together to show the system of the consonant couples.  

 Notes

Numerals
Lanna has two sets of numerals. The first set, Lek Nai Tham, is reserved for liturgical purposes. The other set, Lek Hora, is used in everyday life.

Relation with other scripts 
Tai Tham is very similar in shape to Burmese script since both are derived from Old Mon script. New Tai Lue is a descendant of Tai Tham with its shape simplified and many consonants are removed. Thai script looks distinctive to Tai Tham but covers all equivalent consonants including the 8 additional consonants as Thai is the closest sister language to Northern Thai, Khuen, and Lue languages. A variation of Thai script (Sukhothai script) called Fakkham script was also used in Lan Na to write Northern Thai, Khuen, and Lue during the 14th century, influencing the development of the modern Tai Tham script.

Sanskrit and Pali
The Tai Tham script (like all Indic scripts) uses a number of modifications to write Pali and related languages (in particular, Sanskrit). When writing Pali, only 33 consonants and 12 vowels are used.

Pali consonants in Tai Tham script

Sanskrit consonants in Tai Tham script

Unicode block 
Tai Tham script was added to the Unicode Standard in October, 2009 with the release of version 5.2.

The Unicode block for Tai Tham is U+1A20–U+1AAF:

Fonts 

Supports for Tai Tham Unicode font in Microsoft Windows and Microsoft office are still limited causing the widespread use of non-Unicode fonts. Fonts published by the Royal Society of Thailand and Chiang Mai University are also non-Unicode due to this problem and to maximize the ability to transcribe and display the ancient Tai Tham text, which frequently contains various special ligatures and symbols not supported by Unicode. Non-Unicode fonts often use a combination of Thai script and Latin Unicode ranges to resolves the incompatibility problem of Unicode Tai Tham in Microsoft office. However, these fonts may encounter a display problem when used on web browsers as the text can be encoded as an unintelligible Thai text instead. In recent years, many Tai Tham Unicode fonts have been developed for web display and communications via smart phones. Google's Noto Sans Tai Tham becomes the default font for Tai Tham on Mac OS and iOS. However, the current version of this font still fails to display Tai Tham text correctly. The table below gives a list of publicly available Tai Tham fonts.

 Note

References

Further reading
 Khamjan, Mala(มาลา คำจันทร์). Kham Mueang Dictionary(พจนานุกรมคำเมือง). Chiang Mai: bookworm, 2008. .
 
 Owen, R. Wyn. 2017. A description and linguistic analysis of the Tai Khuen writing system. Journal of the Southeast Asian Linguistics Society 10.1, 140-164.
Trager, Ed. (2014). Hariphunchai Tai Tham Font Project.
Wordingham, Richard. Lamphun glyphs (A page with specimen of the font Lamphun). Retrieved 15 May 2019.

 Alan Wood's Tai Tham test page

External links

 ISO/IEC 10646:2003/Amd.5:2008 Universal Multiple-Octet Coded Character Set (UCS) -- Amendment 5: AMENDMENT 5: Tai Tham, Tai Viet, Avestan, Egyptian Hieroglyphs, CJK Unified Ideographs Extension C, and other characters

Brahmic scripts
Thai culture
Writing systems without word boundaries
Lan Na